The weightlifting competition at the 1976 Summer Olympics in Montreal consisted of nine weight classes, all for men only. The clean and press was dropped from the included lifts after the 1972 games in Munich, due to disagreement over proper form. The Games of 1976 were the first Olympics to start testing for anabolic steroids.

Medal summary

Zbigniew Kaczmarek of Poland originally won the 67.5 kg event, Valentin Khristov of Bulgaria originally won the 110 kg event, and Blagoy Blagoev of Bulgaria originally won silver in the 82.5 kg event, but they were disqualified and stripped of their medals after they tested positive for anabolic steroids.

Medal table

References

Sources
 

 
1976 Summer Olympics events
1976
1976 in weightlifting